Hugo de los Reyes Chávez (born January 6, 1933) is a Venezuelan state politician and the father of the late Venezuelan President Hugo Chávez (1954 - 2013).

Early life
Chávez was born in 1933 to José Rafael Saavedra and Rosa Inés Chávez. He has a brother Marcos Chávez.

Political career

Hugo was a regional director of education and subsequently rose to prominence as a member of the social christian Party COPEI. He was governor of Barinas for three terms from 1998 to 2008.

Personal life
Chávez and his wife, Elena Frías de Chávez, started their careers as local schoolteachers. He dropped out of school after completing the sixth grade, later qualifying to teach. Reyes Chávez had 11 children.

He is best known as the father of President Hugo Chávez; he is also the father of Adán Chávez, who succeeded him as Barinas governor, and the mayor of Sabaneta, Barinas, Anibal José Chávez Frías.

References

1933 births
Living people
Governors of Barinas (state)
Chávez family
Copei politicians
Venezuelan schoolteachers
United Socialist Party of Venezuela politicians
Fifth Republic Movement politicians